Udo Lehmann (born 28 May 1973) is a German bobsledder who competed from 1994 to 2004. He won two medals in the four-man event at the FIBT World Championships with a gold in 2004 and a bronze in 1995.

References
Bobsleigh four-man world championship medalists since 1930
FIBT profile

1973 births
German male bobsledders
Living people